The following lists events that happened during 1880 in New Zealand.

Incumbents

Regal and viceregal
Head of State – Queen Victoria
Governor – Sir Hercules Robinson leaves on 9 September to take up the position of High Commissioner in South Africa.  The Hon. Sir Arthur Hamilton-Gordon becomes Governor on 29 November.

Government and law
The 7th New Zealand Parliament continues.

Speaker of the House – Maurice O'Rorke.
Premier – John Hall (New Zealand)
Minister of Finance – Harry Atkinson
Chief Justice – Hon Sir James Prendergast

Main centre leaders
Mayor of Auckland – Thomas Peacock followed by James Clark
Mayor of Christchurch – Charles Thomas Ick
Mayor of Dunedin – Archibald Hilson Ross
Mayor of Wellington – William Hutchison

Events
September: The Waikato Mail begins publishing in Cambridge. The newspaper is produced three times a week. It ceases to publish in 1883.

Undated
Wellington Teachers College is opened.

Sport

Horse racing
New Zealand Cup winner: Le Loup
New Zealand Derby winner: Sir Mordred
Auckland Cup winner: Foul Play
Wellington Cup winner: Foul Play

see also :Category:Horse races in New Zealand.

Rugby union
The Wellington Union is the first to hold a club championships.

Provincial club rugby champions
Wellington: Athletic

Shooting
Ballinger Belt: Sergeant Okey (Taranaki)

Swimming
The first swimming club in New Zealand, Christchurch Amateur Swimming Club, is formed on 11 October. It is soon followed by others throughout New Zealand.

Tennis
Prior to this year there are tennis clubs in Auckland, Christchurch and Dunedin. As well as tennis club members also play croquet, bowls and archery.

Births
 3 August: Arthur Hall, politician.

Deaths
 9 March: Edward Hargreaves, Member of Parliament.
 12 March: Thomas Birch, Member of Parliament
 27 July: David Forsyth Main, Member of Parliament.

See also
List of years in New Zealand
Timeline of New Zealand history
History of New Zealand
Military history of New Zealand
Timeline of the New Zealand environment
Timeline of New Zealand's links with Antarctica

References
General
 Romanos, J. (2001) New Zealand Sporting Records and Lists. Auckland: Hodder Moa Beckett. 
Specific

External links